Moraxella caprae is a Gram-negative, aerobic, nonmotile bacterium in the genus  Moraxella, which was isolated from the nasal flora of goats in Lyon in France.

References

External links
Type strain of Moraxella caprae at BacDive -  the Bacterial Diversity Metadatabase
	

Moraxellaceae
Bacteria described in 1995